Kuznetsk Depression (Kuznetskaya kotlovina) is located among mountains of South-Central Siberia, including: Kuznetsk Alatau to the Northeast, Salair Ridge to the Southwest, and Mountainous Shoria to the South. It is within Kemerovo Oblast.

Geography
The depression has elevations up to ,.

It is split by a network of river valleys. The major rivers are the Tom River and Inya River, with other tributaries of Ob River.

They include Taradanov's Ridge, Saltymakov's Ridge, and the Karakan Mountains.

Economy
The Kuznetsk Depression contains the famous coal-mining Kuznetsk Basin. The main cities in it are Kemerovo, Novokuznetsk, and Prokopyevsk.

See also
 Kuznetsk Basin
 Depression (geology)
 Geography of South-Central Siberia
 Minusinsk Depression
 Tuva Depression

References 

Depressions of Russia
Landforms of Kemerovo Oblast
Geography of Central Asia